Tazraq is a village in Balkh Province, in northern Afghanistan. It is located near the border with Tajikistan, located on the Amu Darya river which forms the boundary.

See also 
Balkh Province

References

Populated places in Balkh Province
Villages in Afghanistan